Colasposoma kindaense is a species of leaf beetle of the Democratic Republic of the Congo. It was first described by the Belgian entomologist  in 1941.

References

kindaense
Beetles of the Democratic Republic of the Congo
Endemic fauna of the Democratic Republic of the Congo